International Association for the Semiotics of Law is a philosophical society founded in 1987 whose purpose is to promote semiotic analysis of the law. The association publishes the International Journal for the Semiotics of Law, the leading journal of international journal in legal semiotics.

External links 
International Journal for the Semiotics of Law website

International learned societies
Philosophical societies
Semiotics organizations
International law organizations